Eddie Murphy: Comedian (1983) was Eddie Murphy's second album. The album was the recipient of one Grammy, Best Comedy Album, at the 1984 Grammy Awards.

The full concert of this performance was released as a 1983 HBO special called Eddie Murphy Delirious.

Track listing
Faggots Revisited/Sexual Prime – 8:09
Singers – 10:04
Ice Cream Man/Shoe Throwin' Mothers – 5:52
Modern Women – 2:16
The Barbecue – 12:44
The Fart Game – 1:55
Politics/Racism – 4:34
Languages – 2:13
TV – 2:25

Charts

Certifications

References

1983 live albums
1980s comedy albums
Eddie Murphy albums
Columbia Records live albums
Grammy Award for Best Comedy Album
Live comedy albums
Spoken word albums by American artists
Live spoken word albums
Stand-up comedy albums